The Springer Building is a historic building in Albuquerque, New Mexico. It was built during 1929–30 and was listed on the National Register of Historic Places in 1980.

It was designed by the Springer Transfer Company, including architect Miles Brittelle, Sr.  Another architect, George M. Williamson, designed a different office and storage facility for the Springer Transfer Company, with access to the Santa Fe railway line.

The architect took advantage of massing and structure required to give the Springer Building, with slight adjustments, a Mayan architecture motif.

References

Commercial buildings on the National Register of Historic Places in New Mexico
Commercial buildings completed in 1929
Buildings and structures in Albuquerque, New Mexico
National Register of Historic Places in Albuquerque, New Mexico
New Mexico State Register of Cultural Properties